Stojan Andov (born 30 November 1935) is a Macedonian politician, a founding member of the Liberal Party of Macedonia and a former president of Parliament from 1993 to 1997.

Early years and education
Stojan Andov was born in Kavadarci, North Macedonia (formerly Yugoslavia) in November 1935, where he attended primary school and high school. Andov graduated from the Faculty of Economics in Skopje, and received a master's degree at the University of Belgrade. He lived in Belgrade from 1975 to 1981 with his wife, Marija. They have two children: a son, Bosko Andov, and a daughter, Liljana. Bosko Andov is a manager of Australian insurance company QBE in Macedonia, married to doctor Valentina Andova have 2 children. And daughter Liljana is a pedagogist, she is married and has 2 children.

In 1995, Andov traveled to the United States to meet former US president Bill Clinton. Stojan Andov become an author, authoring the books: "На мој начин" (My own way), "Патувањата на далечниот исток - Ирак" (Travels in the Far East - Iraq), "Ставот и Љубовта" (Attitude and Love), and "Кицо американецот" (Kiko the American), "Приказната на Марија" (Maria'story).

Political history
Andov was elected Vice-President of the Executive Council of the Republic (the Macedonian Government at the time) and, at present, he is a member of the Macedonian Delegation at the Assembly of Republics and Regions and a member of the federal Government in three mandates in former Yugoslavia.

As a founder of the Liberal Party, Andov led it as President from 1990–1997. He was also the ambassador of Yugoslavia in Iraq from 1986 to 1990, leading him to write a book entitled 'Travels in the Far East - Iraq' (Патувањата на далечниот исток - Ирак). He was the first President of Parliament of the independent Republic of Macedonia from January 8, 1991 until March 6, 1996, up to the time of the Liberal Party's merger with the former DP (Democratic Party). Andov became President of the Council of the newly established political party. After the renewal of the Liberal Party of Macedonia in 1999, he was elected Member of its Executive Committee. Andov was elected President on the VII (Extraordinary) Congress of LP once again in June 2001, and was re-elected President of LP on the VIII Congress of LP in July 2004.

During the elections in 1990, Andov was elected Member of the Assembly and became President of the Assembly in January 1991. During the second elections, in 1994, he was re-elected for M.P. and President of the Assembly, a position he held until 1996. In this capasity, he was serving as interim President of the Republic of Macedonia from October to November 1995 in the sick absence of Kiro Gligorov.

Andov was elected Member of Assembly during the National Elections in 1998, and was President of the Parliamentary Committee on monetary, credit policy and banking at the same time. In 1999 he was a candidate for President of the Republic of Macedonia. On November 30, 2000, he was elected President of the Assembly once again and performed this duty up to September 2002.

Currently Andov is a Member of Assembly, Coordinator of the Parliamentary Group of LP in the Assembly of North Macedonia, and President of the Permanent Committee on Citizens' Freedoms and Rights of the Macedonian Assembly.

References

1935 births
Living people
People from Kavadarci
Yugoslav diplomats
Speakers of the Assembly of North Macedonia
Liberal Democratic Party (North Macedonia) politicians
Liberal Party of Macedonia politicians
University of Belgrade Faculty of Economics alumni